Eilema rufitincta is a moth of the subfamily Arctiinae. It was described by George Hampson in 1914. It is found in Uganda.

References

 

Endemic fauna of Uganda
rufitincta
Moths described in 1914